The 1941–42 Fort Wayne Zollner Pistons season was the inaugural season of the franchise in the National Basketball League. The team was led by guard Bobby McDermott who would go on to become one of the best shooters in NBL history and the league's all time leader in points. The Pistons finished the season with a record of 15 wins and 9 losses which earned them the #2 seed in the inaugural NBL Playoffs. In the first round the team defeated the Akron Goodyear Wingfoots in the games before losing to the Oshkoh All-Stars in 3 Games in the Championship series.

Roster

League standings

References

Fort Wayne Zollner Pistons seasons
Fort Wayne